Il Processo di Biscardi  is a sports talk and debate television program produced by Frenter Communication and aired on various affiliated local television channels in Italy, entirely devoted to Italian Soccer, in particular the Serie A.

Former television
Rai 3
Tele+2
La7 (1996-2006)
7 Gold (2006-2013)
T9 (2013)

Commentators and Presenters

Current commentators and presenters
 Aldo Biscardi
 Georgia Viero
 Giorgio Martino
 Maurizio Biscardi

Former commentators
 Tiziano Crudeli
 Elio Corno
 Marica Longini
 Antonio Paolino
 Federico Bertone
 Daniele Capezzone
 Fabio Ravezzani
 Maurizio Mosca
 Helenio Herrera
 Giampiero Mughini

Involvement in Calciopoli

In May 2006, extracts from intercepted telephone conversations between Biscardi and Luciano Moggi were revealed. In the climate of the scandal which became known as Calciopoli, it was revealed that the Juventus official had instructed Biscardi on what to say or not say during his television transmission. Biscardi therefore joined the list of those under investigation (July 2007) although he was later archived with a penal profile. In the meantime, Biscardi left La7 (May 2006) and took his programme with him to a new channel, 7 Gold. At the same time, in September 2006, the Italian Order of Journalists imposed a 6-month suspension due to the scandal which led to an open and heated confrontation with the Order.

References

External links

t9 web site
7 gold

Italian sports television series
1980 Italian television series debuts